The Massereene Barracks shooting took place at Massereene Barracks in Antrim, Northern Ireland. On 7 March 2009, two off-duty British soldiers of 38 Engineer Regiment were shot dead outside the barracks. Two other soldiers and two civilian delivery men were also shot and wounded during the attack. A dissident Irish republican paramilitary group, the Real IRA, claimed responsibility.

The shootings were the first British military fatalities in Northern Ireland since 1997. Two days later, the Continuity IRA shot dead Stephen Carroll a Police Service of Northern Ireland (PSNI) officer; the first Northern Ireland police officer to be killed by paramilitaries since 1998.

Background
From the late 1960s until the late 1990s, Northern Ireland underwent a conflict known as the Troubles, in which more than 3,500 people were killed. More than 700 of those killed were British military personnel, deployed as part of Operation Banner. The vast majority of these British military personnel were killed by the Provisional Irish Republican Army (IRA), which waged an armed campaign to force the British to negotiate a withdrawal from Northern Ireland. In 1997 the IRA called a final ceasefire and in 1998 the Good Friday Agreement was signed. This is widely seen as marking the end of the conflict.

However, breakaway groups opposed to the ceasefire ("dissident Irish republicans") continued a low-level armed campaign against the British security forces in Northern Ireland (see Dissident Irish Republican campaign). The main group involved was an IRA splinter group known as the 'Real' IRA. In 2007, the British Army formally ended Operation Banner and greatly reduced its presence in Northern Ireland.

The low-level 'dissident republican' campaign continued. In January 2009, security forces had to defuse a bomb in Castlewellan, and in 2008 three separate incidents saw dissident republicans attempt to kill Police Service of Northern Ireland (PSNI) officers in Derry, Castlederg and Dungannon. In all three cases, PSNI officers were seriously wounded. Two of the attacks involved firearms while the other involved an under-car booby-trap bomb.

Shooting
At about 9.40 P.M. on the evening of Saturday of 7 March, four off-duty British soldiers of the Royal Engineers walked outside the barracks to receive a pizza delivery from two delivery men. As the exchange was taking place, two masked gunmen in a nearby car opened fire with PM md. 63 automatic rifles. The firing lasted for more than 30 seconds with more than 60 shots being fired. After the initial burst of gunfire, the gunmen walked over to the wounded soldiers lying on the ground and fired again at close range, killing two of them. Those killed were Sappers Mark Quinsey from Birmingham and Patrick Azimkar from London. The other two soldiers and two deliverymen were wounded. The soldiers were wearing desert fatigues and were to be deployed to Afghanistan the next day. A few hours later, the stolen car involved was found abandoned near Randalstown, eight miles from the barracks.

A Dublin-based newspaper, the Sunday Tribune, received a phone call from a caller using a recognised Real IRA codeword. The caller claimed responsibility for the attack on behalf of the Real IRA, adding that the civilian pizza deliverymen were legitimate targets as they were "collaborating with the British by servicing them".

The shootings were the first British military fatalities in Northern Ireland since Lance Bombardier Stephen Restorick was shot dead by the Provisional IRA in February 1997, during the Troubles. The attack came days after a suggestion by Northern Ireland's police chief, Sir Hugh Orde, that the likelihood of a "terrorist" attack in Northern Ireland was at its highest level for several years.

Civilian security officers belonging to the Northern Ireland Security Guard Service were criticised for not opening fire during the incident, as a result of which plans were made to retrain and rearm them.

The barracks were shut down in 2010 as part of the reduction of the British Army presence in Northern Ireland.

Craigavon shooting

Two days after the Massereene Barracks shooting, PSNI officer Stephen Carroll was shot dead in Craigavon, County Armagh. This was the first killing of a police officer in Northern Ireland since 1998. The Continuity IRA claimed responsibility for this shooting and stated that "As long as there is British involvement in Ireland, these attacks will continue".

Reaction
The morning after the attack, worshippers came out of St Comgall's Church after mass and kept vigil near the barracks. They were joined by their priest and clerics from the town's other churches. On 11 March 2009, thousands of people attended silent protests against the killings at several venues in Northern Ireland.

The killings were condemned by all mainstream political parties in Northern Ireland, as well as the Irish government, the United States government and Pope Benedict XVI. Sinn Féin condemned the killings, but was criticised for being less vehement than others in its condemnation.

 First Minister Peter Robinson suggested that the shooting was a "terrible reminder of the events of the past" and that "These murders were a futile act by those who command no public support and have no prospect of success in their campaign. It will not succeed".
 Deputy First Minister Martin McGuinness said "I was a member of the IRA, but that war is over now. The people responsible for last night's incident are clearly signalling that they want to resume or restart that war. Well, I deny their right to do that." He later stated that the shooters of the PSNI officer killed two days later were "traitors to the island of Ireland".
 Sinn Féin President Gerry Adams condemned the shootings, saying that those responsible had "no support, no strategy to achieve a United Ireland. Their intention is to bring British soldiers back onto the streets. They want to destroy the progress of recent times and to plunge Ireland back into conflict. Irish republicans and democrats have a duty to oppose this and to defend the peace process".
 British Prime Minister Gordon Brown visited the scene of the attack on 9 March 2009 and met political leaders in Northern Ireland to urge a united front in the face of the violence. He stated that "The whole country is shocked and outraged at the evil and cowardly attacks on soldiers serving their country" and also that "No murderer will be able to derail a peace process that has the support of the great majority of Northern Ireland".
 Taoiseach Brian Cowen said "A tiny group of evil people can not and will not undermine the will of the people of Ireland to live in peace together. Violence has been utterly rejected by the people of this island, both North and South".
 At a press conference on 25 March 2009, Richard Walsh, the spokesman for Republican Sinn Féin, a party linked to the Continuity IRA, said the killings were "an act of war" rather than murder. "We have always upheld the right of the Irish people to use any level of controlled and disciplined force to drive the British out of Ireland. We make no apology for that". He also described the PSNI as "an armed adjunct of the British Army".

Trials
On 14 March 2009, the PSNI arrested three men in connection with the killings, one of whom was former IRA prisoner Colin Duffy. He had broken away from mainstream republicanism and criticised Sinn Féin's decision to back the new PSNI. On 25 March 2009, after a judicial review of their detention, all the men were ordered to be released by the Belfast High Court; Duffy was immediately re-arrested on suspicion of murder. On 26 March 2009, Duffy was charged with the murder of the two soldiers and the attempted murder of five other people. The following day he appeared in court for indictment and was remanded in custody to await trial after it was alleged that his full DNA profile was found on a latex glove inside the vehicle used by the gunmen. There was also soil found in the car they drove that matched the soil on the ground in front of the barracks. 

Brian Shivers, a cystic fibrosis sufferer, was charged with the soldiers' murders and the attempted murder of six other people. He was also charged with possession of firearms and ammunition with intent to endanger life. He was arrested in Magherafelt in July 2009.

In January 2012 Shivers was convicted of the soldiers' murders, but Duffy was acquitted. In January 2013, Shivers's conviction was overturned by Northern Ireland's highest appeals court. A May 2013 retrial found Shivers not guilty. He was cleared of all charges and immediately released from jail. The judge questioned why the Real IRA would choose Shivers as the gunman, with his cystic fibrosis and his engagement to a Protestant woman.

Shivers's solicitor stated

See also
Timeline of Real Irish Republican Army actions
Timeline of the Northern Ireland Troubles and peace process

References

 
2009 in Northern Ireland
2009 mass shootings in Europe
2009 murders in the United Kingdom
2000s in County Antrim
2000s mass shootings in the United Kingdom 
2010s trials
21st-century history of the British Army
Attacks by Republicans since the Good Friday Agreement
Deaths by firearm in Northern Ireland
March 2009 crimes 
March 2009 events in the United Kingdom
Mass shootings in County Antrim
Military history of County Antrim
Murder in County Antrim
Murder trials
Real Irish Republican Army actions
Royal Engineers
Terrorist incidents in County Antrim
Terrorist incidents in the United Kingdom in 2009
2000s murders in Northern Ireland
2009 crimes in Ireland
Trials in the United Kingdom